Diekeana admirabilis is a species of beetle in the family Coccinellidae, formerly placed in the genus Epilachna.

References 

Coccinellidae
Beetles described in 1874